Obilić is a town and municipality in central Kosovo.

Obilić may also refer to:

 Miloš Obilić, a medieval Serbian knight who died in 1389
 Obilić, a village in Serbia
 Obilić Medal, founded in 1847 by Njegoš as the highest military decoration in Montenegro
 Medal of Miloš Obilić or Medal for Bravery (Serbia), founded in 1913 by King Peter I of Serbia
 Order of Miloš Obilić, an Order of the Republic of Srpska established in 1993

Sports 
 FK Obilić, a football club based in Belgrade, Serbia
 FK Mladi Obilić, a football club based in Belgrade, Serbia
 FK Obilić Stadium, a multi-purpose stadium in Belgrade, Serbia
 FK Obilić Herceg Novi, a football club from the village Herceg Zelenika, Montenegro